The Coordination Council for the Transfer of Power is a non-governmental body created by presidential candidate Sviatlana Tsikhanouskaya to facilitate a democratic transfer of power in Belarus. The Council, founded during the 2020 Belarusian protests in response to the disputed 2020 Belarusian presidential election, has 64 core members with a 7-member leadership presidium.

The first meeting of the Council took place on 18 August 2020. From late August to mid-October, Tsikhanouskaya and several of the presidium members were arrested or chose to exile themselves from Belarus, fearing repression by Belarusian security forces. In September 2020, Lithuania, where the council is now based, became the only sovereign state to recognize the CCTP as the sole legitimate government of Belarus.

History

Creation
The formation of the Coordination Council was announced on 14 August, 2020, in a video released by Tsikhanouskaya. In the video, she also claimed that she had received between 60 and 70% of the vote in the 9 August presidential election, more than enough for an outright victory over longtime president Alexander Lukashenko. She appealed to the international community to recognise her as the winner. Tsikhanouskaya stated that the aims of the council is to coordinate a peaceful and orderly transfer of power from Lukashenko and to hold a new, free and fair presidential election at the earliest opportunity.

On 17 August, Tsikhanouskaya released a video in which she stated that she was ready to lead a transitional government.

On 18 August, the Council held its first press conference with questions being answered by Olga Kovalkova, Maxim Znak, Maria Kolesnikova, Pavel Latushko, and Sergey Dylevsky.

On 19 August, the Council elected a 7-member Presidium.

August–September 2020
On 19 August, Tsikhanouskaya recorded an appeal to EU leaders not to recognise the presidential election results in a meeting of EU heads of government scheduled for later that day.

On 19 August, Alexander Lukashenko described the Coordination Council members, stating, "Some of them were once in or close to power. They were kicked out and hold a grudge. Others are outright Nazis. Just take a look at their names." On the same day, former presidential contender Valery Tsepkalo said he did not understand the criteria for the new council's formation and its tasks. He complained that he was not invited.

On 20 August, Prosecutor-General Alexander Konyuk initiated criminal proceedings against the Coordination Council members under Article 361 of the Belarusian Criminal Code. In a statement released, Konyuk alleged that the "creation and activity of the Coordination Council are aimed at seizure of state power, and at harming national security" and that "the creation of such bodies is not allowed in law, and they are unconstitutional." On the same day, presidium members Dylevsky and Znak were summoned for police questioning. Znak and Dylevsky arrived for questioning on the morning of 21 August and were later released.

On 21 August, Tsikhanouskaya's lawyer Znak filed a formal protest concerning the presidential election with the Supreme Court of Belarus. Znak said that "A complaint has been submitted. A decision on when to start proceedings is due within three days." On 24 August, presidium members Dylevsky and Kovalkova were detained by OMON officers whilst attempting to support a wildcat strike at the Minsk Tractor Works factory. Presidium members Vlasova, Latushko, Alexievich, and Kolesnikova were also summoned for questioning. Both Kovalkova and Dylevsky were sentenced to 10 days' imprisonment the following day.

On 26 August, Ivonka Survilla, President of the Rada of the Belarusian People's Republic, expressed her support for Tsikhanouskaya.

On 31 August, presidium member Vlasova was detained by the OMON.

On 5 September, presidium member Kovalkova chose to leave Belarus rather than remain in detention over the Section 361 charges.

On 7 September, presidium member Kolesnikova was detained by unidentified masked men in Minsk.

On 9 September 2020, the only member of the presidium not yet arrested or missing was Nobel Prize in Literature laureate Svetlana Alexievich. However, there were reports from Belarusian journalists that unknown men were knocking at the doors of her home. As of 9 August 2020, she was under round-the-clock guard by diplomats for several European countries, including ambassadors from Poland and Lithuania.

At a press conference in Poland, council member Pavel Latushko condemned the situation in Belarus, claiming that 10,000 people were subject to misconduct and imprisonment orchestrated by the security forces. He stated that 450 people were tortured, and protesters were put into jail on fake charges. Latushko and Olga Kovalkova invited the OSCE and United Nations to send observers to Belarus to assess the situation.

25 October ultimatum
On 16 October, Svetlana Tsikhanouskaya was put on the wanted lists in Belarus and Russia on charges of "attempting to overthrow the constitutional order".

National Anti-crisis Management

In late October 2020, the Pavel Latushko, a presidium member, created National Anti-crisis Management (NAM), a shadow government, to manage the detailed administration tasks of a peaceful transfer of power leading to the inauguration of a newly elected president. NAM published internal reports of the Belarusian Ministry of Internal Affairs, according to which 25,800 people had been detained between 9 August and 9 November 2020, and 4000 complaints of torture and other illegal actions had been lodged with the ministry and ignored.

On 25 February 2023, Pavel Latushko announced he had left the Coordinating Council.

Truth commission
In late November 2020, the Council published a draft document for debating the creation of a truth and reconciliation commission for the purposes of transitional justice. The commission, termed a "special agency", would "consider the use of physical force, special equipment and weapons against citizens in connection with political positions" or the violation or calls for the violation of citizens' rights by public officials. The agency would only consider individual responsibility; membership of an organisation would not be grounds for prosecution. In cases in which no physical harm was involved, the accused would go through a conciliation procedure. Other cases would be prosecuted under administrative, "disciplinary," or criminal law. The showing of "effective remorse" or the lack of it would weaken or strengthen some of the financial and property penalties in the proposed legal definition of the agency's powers.

Transitional government

On 9 August 2022, the Coordination Council announced the formation of the United Transitional Cabinet, a transitional government led by Tsikhanouskaya.

Objectives and structure

Objectives
The Council has stated that its primary goals are:
To end the political persecution of citizens and for those responsible to be brought to justice.
For the release of all political prisoners in Belarus.
The annulment of the 9 August presidential election and for new elections to be conducted to international standards organised by a reconstituted central elections commission.

Council Presidium member Pavel Latushko stated that the Council does not want to radically change the course of Belarusian foreign policy, adding that it wants to maintain "friendly and profound" relations with Russia, as well as to have a good working relationship with the European Union and to act as a bridge between the east and west.

Structure
Tsikhanouskaya stated that applications to the council were open to Belarusian citizens who recognised the officially declared election results to be falsified, and who were trusted by social groups. Applications were invited from individuals representing workers' groups, political parties, trade unions, and other organisations of civic society and from authoritative figures such as doctors, teachers, business leaders, authors, or sportspersons. Olga Kovalkova and lawyer Maxim Znak were given responsibility for collating and approving membership applications.

Presidium

The Council elected a 7-member presidium on 19 August. The members of the presidium are:
 Svetlana Alexievich, Nobel laureate in Literature
 Sergei Dylevsky, leader of Minsk Tractor Works (MTZ) strike committee
 Maria Kalesnikava, headquarters coordinator of Viktar Babaryka's 2020 presidential campaign 
 Olga Kovalkova, Belarusian Christian Democracy party co-chair
 Pavel Latushko, former Minister of Culture; Latushko announced that he had quit the council in late February 2023.
 Liliya Vlasova, mediator and lawyer
 Maxim Znak, lawyer, member of Viktar Babaryka's headquarters

Detentions and location

Members
An initial membership list, consisting of 35 members, was circulated on 17 August and expanded to 51 members on 18 August. The council had 59 members in its core membership group on 29 August 2020, increasing to 64 members . In addition to the 7-member presidium, other members, include athlete Nadzeya Astapchuk, film director Jury Chaščavacki, civic leader Ales Bialiatski, politician , physicist Alexander Dabravolski, politician , Mikalai Kazlov of the United Civic Party of Belarus, Andrei Kureichik, politician Vital Rymasheuski, painter , former EPAM Systems top-manager Maksim Bahratsou, independent analyst Siarhei Chaly. On 24 August 2020, the council included an "expanded" support list of 600 members.

Working groups
, the Coordination Council included working groups on several socio-political themes:
 a trade union group ProfSoyuz Online for encouraging the creation of independent trade unions
 a women's group
 a support group for local initiatives in the districts of Belarus
 KOTOC: legal advice for interactions with and electoral participation in sub-national formal structures (oblasts, raion)
 an economic group
 a business support group
 Christian Vision
 a political prisoners and human rights group
 an education group
 a group for the Belarusian language and culture.

Representatives
On August 31, 2021 the Coordination Council presented a structure update that implies the election of representatives in key areas of development.

Representatives of the Coordination Council should act as a liaison between international partners and national actors in certain areas, help establish professional ties, prepare analytical notes on the situation in their field, promote topics among international structures, participate in expert discussions, jointly develop support plans for certain sectors.

Representatives are elected positions with a 6-month mandate. The candidates publicly present the program, which should be implemented in the next six months.

 Business and innovation economy - Tatsiana Marynich
 Eastern Partnership - Valery Matskevich
 Civil Society - Andrey Egorov
 Culture - Andrei Kureichik
 Political prisoners - Tatsiana Khomich (Maria Kalesnikava's sister)
 Human Capital Development - Olga Kovalkova
 Digital transformation - Alex Shkor
 Jurisprudence - Mikhail Kirilyuk
 Sports - Nadzeya Astapchuk

International relations
Tsikhanouskaya asked the international community to support the efforts of the Coordination Council.

Organisations

 Tsikhanouskaya was invited to 1st meeting of the Council of Europe Contact Group on Belarus on 8 November 2022, where Secretary-General Marija Pejčinović Burić stated that "The Council of Europe stands on principle with Belarus' democratic forces and civil society".

 Josep Borrell, the European Union High Representative for Foreign Affairs and Security Policy, called for the authorities in Belarus to stop criminal proceedings against members of the coordination council. The European Parliament recognised the coordination council as the "interim representation of the people demanding democratic change in Belarus" and stated that it would not recognise Alexander Lukashenko as president of Belarus after the expiry of his term on 5 November 2020. Tsikhanouskaya addressed the Foreign Affairs Committee of the European Parliament on 13 October 2022. On 24 November 2022, the European Parliament passed a resolution welcoming the formation of the United Transitional Cabinet.

 Tsikhanouskaya participated in the 29th OSCE Ministerial Council in Łódź, Poland in December 2022  and spoke at the OSCE Parliamentary Assembly on 24 February 2023 in Vienna, Austria.

 Tsikhanouskaya attended the 59th meeting of the Munich Security Conference in February 2023 where she held meetings with the President of the European Commission Ursula von der Leyen, German Chancellor Olaf Scholz and former speaker of the US House of Representatives Nancy Pelosi.

 Tsikhanouskaya attended the United Nations General Assembly in September 2022.

 Tsikhanouskaya attended the annual summit of the World Economic Forum in Davos, Switzerland in January 2023. At the summit, Tsikhanouskaya held bilateral meetings with the leaders from the Republic of Ireland, Switzerland, Belgium, Moldova, Luxembourg and Spain. She also held meetings with representatives from the European Commission, the International Labour Organization, the European Investment Bank, and European Bank for Reconstruction and Development.

States

 Canadian Prime Minister Justin Trudeau met  Tsikhanouskaya in Ottawa 23 November 2022 and reaffirmed Canada's support for the democratic aspirations of the Belarusian people.

 Estonian Foreign Minister Urmas Reinsalu announced on 18 August 2020 that Estonia does not recognize the results of the 2020 election. On 24 October 2022, Tsikhanouskaya met with Reinsalu in Tallinn, and he announced plans to appoint an "ambassador at large" to the Belarusian opposition. Tsikhanouskaya also met with President of Estonia Alar Karis and addressed the Riigikogu. Foreign Minister Urmas Reinsalu met Tsikhanouskaya in Tallinn on 24 October 2022 and expressed support for the democratic aspirations of the Belarusian people.

 Tsikhanouskaya visited Croatia in January 2023 and held meetings with prime minister Andrej Plenković and foreign minister Gordan Grlić Radman.

 Tsikhanouskaya visited Helsinki in December 2022 where she met with Finnish President Sauli Niinistö and Prime Minister Sanna Marin.

 Lithuanian President Gitanas Nausėda spoke with Tsikhanouskaya by telephone, offering his support for the coordination council. The Prime Minister of Lithuania called on Belarus to conduct new, "free and fair" elections supervised by international monitors. Lithuanian Foreign Minister Linas Linkevičius referred to Lukashenko as the "former president" of Belarus. On 20 August, Lithuanian prime minister Saulius Skvernelis invited Sviatlana to his office and publicly referred to her as "the national leader of Belarus. On 10 September 2020, a law was passed by the Lithuanian Parliament which recognises Tsikhanouskaya as the "elected leader of the people of Belarus" and the Coordination Council as the "only legitimate representatives of the Belarusian people". The resolution also declares that Lukashenko is an "illegitimate leader".

 Polish Prime Minister, Mateusz Morawiecki, referred to the Coordination Council as the right partner for the authorities to negotiate with.  Tsikhanouskaya met with Polish President Andrzej Duda in Warsaw on 8 December 2022.

 On 25 August, a spokesperson for Russian President Vladimir Putin welcomed that the leadership of the Coordination Council did not want to reduce ties with Russia and instead hoped to continue with good bilateral relationships between the two countries. On March 9, 2021, Russian Ambassador to Belarus Dmitry Mezentsev said in an interview to the RBK TV channel that the Coordinating Council asked him for a personal meeting, but the diplomat refused. "These are people no one has ever elected, these are people who are not vested with the trust of millions of voters. These are people who have defined themselves as such. This is such one of the public associations, maybe the same as a society of book lovers, philatelists, numismatists, fans of this or that club. But then they should be engaged in the public field of club work, and not engaged in the overthrow of the government".
 The US Secretary of State in a statement urged the Belarusian government to actively engage Belarusian society, including through the newly established Coordination Council, in a way that reflects what the Belarusian people are demanding, for the sake of the future of Belarus, and for a successful Belarus. The United States Government stated that "the people have clearly rejected the regime".

Citizens' protest groups
On 1 November 2020, in the context of the October 2020 Polish protests, Polish citizens led by All-Poland Women's Strike created a Consultative Council that they said was inspired by the Belarusian Coordination Council.

See also
Belarusian democracy movement
Rada of the Belarusian Democratic Republic
Belarusian partisan movement (2020–present)

References

External links

 Профсоюз онлайн - проект для вступления в независимые профсоюзы trade union working group
 Инициатива КОТОС: Коллегиальные органы территориального общественного самоуправления local government election/legal interaction working group
 Фемгруппа КС women's working group on Telegram

Social media 
Coordination Council on Facebook
Coordination Council on Youtube
Coordination Council on Telegram

2020–2021 Belarusian protests
Belarusian opposition
Politics of Belarus
2020 in Belarus
Democratization
Anti-communist organizations
Sakharov Prize laureates
Non-governmental organizations
Governments in exile